"Work-based learning (WBL) is an educational strategy that provides students with real-life work experiences where they can apply academic and technical skills and develop their employability." It is a series of educational courses which integrate the school or university curriculum with the workplace to create a different learning paradigm. "Work-based learning deliberately merges theory with practice and acknowledges the intersection of explicit and tacit forms of knowing."

Most WBL programs are generally university accredited courses, aiming at a win-win situation where the learner's needs and the industry requirement for skilled and talented employees both are met. WBL programs are targeted to bridge the gap between the learning and the doing. "Work-based learning strategies provide career awareness, career exploration opportunities, career planning activities and help students attain competencies such as positive work attitudes and other employable skills."

Work-based learning encompasses a diversity of formal, nonformal and informal arrangements including apprenticeships, work placement and informal learning on the job. The key driver is the need for active policies to secure learning that meets the need of the workplace.

Classification

Work-based learning is classified in three ways based on the:

Duration of assignment: The work-based learning experience maybe of a duration of a few hours to 2/4 years
Relation to course work: Work-based learning is generally related to a specific subject taught at school or university
Stipend: WBL assignments may be paid or unpaid

WBL learning strategies
Work-based learning strategies include the following:

Apprenticeship or internship or mentorship: An apprenticeship involves the student working for an employer where he or she is taught and supervised by an experienced employee of the chosen organization. The student is periodically evaluated for progress as per the skills and knowledge acquired, and maybe granted wages accordingly. At the end of the course, the student receives a certificate of service. The student learns in a realistic environment and gets the opportunity to apply his or her knowledge in real-world scenarios.
Job shadowing: Job Shadowing is a short term opportunity that introduces the student to a particular job or career by pairing the student with an employee of the workplace. By following or 'shadowing' the employee, the student gets familiar with the duties and responsibilities associates with that job.
Business/industry field trip: Field trips offer the students an insight in the latest technical advancements and business strategies of an enterprise. Students also gain awareness of the various career opportunities available and understand the driving forces of the community's economy.
Entrepreneurial experience: This includes setting up of specific business, right from the planning, organizing and managing stage to the risk control and management aspects of a business.
Cooperative education: In cooperative education, the work experience is planned in conjunction with the technical classroom instruction. This method is used by universities that do not have access to state-of-art equipment required to transact the technical course practically.
School-based enterprise: A school-based enterprise is a simulated or actual business run by the school. It offers students a learning experience by letting them manage the various aspects of a business
Service learning:This strategy combines community service with career, where students provide volunteer service to public and non-profit agencies, civic and government offices etc.

Key persons
Student: The student is central to the WBL process. The student engages in a WBL program and completes all requirements of the program, maintains high degree of professionalism and acquires necessary competencies for which the WBL program was designed.
Business Mentor: A business mentor sets realistic goals for the student to acquire, engages and supervises them to complete their tasks and is a role model for the student to emulate.
Teacher Coordinator: A teacher coordinator is a certified educator who manages the WBL program and checks on the student progress and supports whenever required to ensure successful completion of the WBL program
School Administrator: The school administrator is key in introducing WBL programs within the curriculum after identifying the appropriate courses that can be learnt through the program.
Parents: Parental support enables successful completion of the WBL program as offer suitable guidance, support and motivation to their wards and approve the WBL program that would be most suitable for meeting their ward's learning needs and career aspirations.

Merits
 Application of classroom learning in real-world setting 
 Establishment of connection between school and work 
 Improvement in critical thinking, analytical reasoning and logical abilities
 Expansion of curriculum and learning facilities
 Meeting the diverse needs of the learner
 Creating a talented and skilled pool of future employees
 Reduces pre-service training time and cost 
 Improvement of student awareness of career opportunities
 Making education relevant and valuable to the social context
 Community building exercise for productive economy

Disadvantages
 Time-consuming activity to identify key courses that can be taught via WBL programs
 Needs careful consideration and planning when introducing WBL strategies within the existing curriculum
 Certain WBL programs may not be in sync with the formal education timelines and pattern
 It is unclear what key elements of this learning may be and that readily available indicators which equate with academic learning outcomes are not necessarily evoking it accuracy.
 Needs effective coordination between all key persons involved in the WBL program
 Effective evaluation strategy needs to be developed for assessing student performance. This should encompass both formative and summative feedback.

Sources

See also
Work-integrated learning

References

Educational practices
Constructivism
Pedagogy
Experiential learning